Kevin & Perry Go Large is the soundtrack album for the 2000 comedy film, Kevin & Perry Go Large. It was compiled by Judge Jules and released on Virgin / EMI who also released the single "Big Girl". Some of the songs which appeared in the film are not included or a different remix is used.

Track listing

CD 01

All The Hits From The Film
Precocious Brats feat. Kevin & Perry - "Big Girl" [2000]
Hybrid feat. Chrissie Hynde - "Kid 2000"
Jools Holland & His Rhythm & Blues Orchestra feat. Jamiroquai - "I'm In The Mood For Love"
The Wiseguys - "Ooh La La" [1998]
Fatboy Slim - "Love Island (4/4 Mix)"
The Clash - "Straight To Hell"
Underworld - "King of Snake (Straight Mate Mix)"
Skip Raiders feat. Jada - "Another Day (Perfecto Dub Mix)"
Y-Traxx - "Mystery Land (Sickboys Courtyard Remix)"
Ayla - "Ayla (DJ Taucher Mix)" [1995]
Ver Vlads - "Crazy Ivan"
Groove Armada - "Chicago"
Gladys Knight - "The Look Of Love"
Nightmares on Wax - "Ethnic Majority"
Tosca - "F**k Dub"
Nightmares on Wax - "Emotion" / "Sweet Harry"
Phil Pope and Los Lidos - "Mi Amour"
Roger Sanchez - "The Partee"
Lange feat. The Morrighan - "Follow Me" [2000]
Sunburst - "Eyeball"
Southside Spinners - "Luvstruck"

CD 02

Kevin & Perry Classic Ibiza Mix
Chicane featuring Bryan Adams - "Don't Give Up" [2000]
Joey Negro feat. Taka Boom - "Must Be The Music" [1999]
Paul Johnson - "Get Get Down" [1999]
David Morales presents The Face - "Needin' U"
Mousse T. vs Hot 'N' Juicy - "Horny"
Perfect Phase presents Those 2 - "Get Wicked"
Ruff Driverz presents Arrola - "Dreaming" [1998]
Flickman - "Sound of Bamboo"
CRW - "I Feel Love (R.A.F. Zone Mix)"
Yomanda - "Sunshine"
Mauro Picotto - "Lizard (Claxxix Mix)"
Signum feat. Scott Mac - "Coming On Strong (Bo Bellow vs. Euphoriah Remix)" [1999]
Ariel - "A9"
Fragma - "Toca's Miracle"
Fragma - "Toca Me (In Petto Mix)"
ATB - "9 PM (Till I Come) (Signum Remix)" [1999]
Blank & Jones - "After Love (Signum Remix)"
Agnelli & Nelson - "Everyday"
DJ Tiësto - "Sparkles (Airscape Mix)" [2000]
Novy vs. Eniac - "Pumpin' (Eniac 99 Mix)"
2000BC - "Everybody"
Children - Robert miles

German / European release
In Germany and Europe the soundtrack was named "Kevin & Perry... Tun Es" (translated from German as "Do it"). Also on this release, the second disc has a different track listing.

European CD 02
Chicane featuring Bryan Adams - "Don't Give Up"
Stella Brown - "Every Woman Needs Love"
Those 2 - "Get Wicked"
Ruff Driverz presents  Arrola - "Dreaming"
CRW - "I Feel Love (R.A.F. Zone Mix)"
Yomanda - "Sunshine"
Mauro Picotto - "Lizard (Claxxix Mix)"
Signum feat. Scott Mac - "Coming On Strong"
Ariel - "A9"
Fragma - "Toca's Miracle"
Fragma - "Toca Me (In Petto Mix)"
Agnelli & Nelson - "Everyday (Lange Mix)"
DJ Tiësto - "Sparkles (Airscape Mix)"
Timo Maas - "Der Schieber"
Quivver - "She Does (Quivver Mix)"
Aurora - "Hear You Calling (En Motion Mix)"
Planet Perfecto - "Bullet in the Gun"
The Thrillseekers - "Synaesthesia (En Motion Mix)"
2000BC - "Everybody"
Precocious Brats feat. Kevin & Perry - "Big Girl (Yomanda Mix)"

See also
Kevin & Perry Go Large
Judge Jules

References

2000 soundtrack albums
Universal Music Group soundtracks
Comedy film soundtracks